Anerastia infumella is a species of snout moth in the genus Anerastia. It was described by Émile Louis Ragonot in 1887, and is known from Iran.

The wingspan is about 19 mm.

References

Moths described in 1887
Anerastiini
Moths of Asia